The London and North Eastern Railway (LNER) Class A8 was a type of 4-6-2T steam locomotive, designed by both Vincent Raven and Nigel Gresley. They were rebuilt from the LNER Class H1s, a 4-4-4T class.

Overview

In 1931, H1 No. 2162 was rebuilt as a 4-6-2T and given the A8 classification.
After a series of trials throughout the North East Area, all of the remaining H1s were rebuilt as A8 4-6-2Ts between 1933 and 1936.
During the process of rebuilding, the boiler was modified to include a Robinson-type superheater rather than the original Schmidt superheater. In 1935, further modifications resulted in the A8 boiler being interchangeable with the A6, A7, A8, H1, and T1 classes.

Service
The rebuilt A8s could easily work the heavy suburban traffic and long distance coastal trains on which they were put to work. They were also welcome replacements for the ageing G5 0-4-4Ts which had been working these services. Allocations of the 45 locomotives were split between the North East / Newcastle area, the Yorkshire Coast Whitby and Scarborough, Hull, and Leeds (Neville Hill).

Technical details 

Weight:  
Boiler pressure: , superheated
Cylinders: three, 
Driving wheels:  
Tractive effort: 
Number sequence in (1957/57) was from 69850 to 69894 (previously 9850 to 9894).

Withdrawal
Diesel railcars were rapidly introduced during the 1950s, and the A8s quickly became surplus to requirements. Withdrawals started in 1957, and the A8 was extinct by the end of 1960.

References

External links 

 The Raven/Gresley A8 Pacific Tank Locomotives LNER Encyclopedia

A8
4-6-2T locomotives
Railway locomotives introduced in 1931
Scrapped locomotives
Standard gauge steam locomotives of Great Britain
2′C1′ h3t locomotives
Rebuilt locomotives
Passenger locomotives